David Karlsson (25 March 1881 – 17 December 1946) was a Swedish wrestler. He competed in the heavyweight event at the 1912 Summer Olympics.

References

1881 births
1946 deaths
Olympic wrestlers of Sweden
Wrestlers at the 1912 Summer Olympics
Swedish male sport wrestlers
Sportspeople from Stockholm